Ivins Mountain is a remote  Navajo Sandstone summit located in Zion National Park, in Washington County of southwest Utah, United States.

Description
Its nearest higher neighbor is Inclined Temple, one half mile to the south, and South Guardian Angel is set approximately three miles to the west. Its name was officially adopted in 1935 by the U.S. Board on Geographic Names. This geographical feature is named after Anthony W. Ivins (1852–1934), a pioneer of southern Utah, and apostle of the Church of Jesus Christ of Latter-day Saints. The town of Ivins, Utah, also bears his name. The first ascent of Ivins Mountain via its west face was made in April 2015 by Dan Stih and Matthew Mower. Precipitation runoff from this mountain drains into North Creek, a tributary of the Virgin River.

Climate
Spring and fall are the most favorable seasons to visit Ivins Mountain. According to the Köppen climate classification system, it is located in a Cold semi-arid climate zone, which is defined by the coldest month having an average mean temperature below 32 °F (0 °C), and at least 50% of the total annual precipitation being received during the spring and summer.

Gallery

See also

 List of mountains in Utah
 Geology of the Zion and Kolob canyons area
 Colorado Plateau

References

External links

 Zion National Park National Park Service
 Ivins Mountain: Weather forecast

Mountains of Utah
Zion National Park
Mountains of Washington County, Utah
Sandstone formations of the United States
North American 2000 m summits